Serejeka is a town in Eritrea. Located in the Maekel (Central) region, it is the capital of the Serejaka district.

References
Statoids.com, retrieved December 8, 2010
Serejeka

Populated places in Eritrea
Central Region (Eritrea)